Dynein, light chain, Tctex-type 3, also known as DYNLT3, is a protein which in humans is encoded by the DYNLT3  gene.

Function 

DYNLT3 is a member of the dynein motor protein family. DYNLT3 binds to BUB3, a spindle checkpoint protein is present on kinetochores at prometaphase. DYNLT3 can also function as a transcription regulator of Bcl-2 gene through binding to SATB1 in a dynein-independent manner.

Interactions
DYNLT3 has been shown to interact with VDAC1.

References

Further reading